Family Dinner – Volume 2 is an album by American jazz fusion group Snarky Puppy that was released on February 12, 2016.

Track listing
All songs arranged by Michael League.

Bonus DVD and digital download tracks

Personnel
 Michael League – bass guitar, ukulele bass, Moog bass, & vocals
 Jay Jennings – trumpet, flugelhorn, vocals
 Mike Maher – trumpet, flugelhorn, vocals
 Chris Bullock – tenor saxophone, flute, alto flute, vocals
 Cory Henry – keyboards, vocals
 Bill Laurance – keyboards, vocals
 Shaun Martin – keyboards, vocals
 Justin Stanton – keyboards, trumpet, vocals
 Bob Lanzetti – guitars, vocals
 Mark Lettieri – guitars, vocals
 Chris McQueen – guitars, vocals
 Robert Searight – drums, vocals
 Larnell Lewis – drums, percussion, vocals
 Nate Werth – percussion, vocals
 Marcelo Woloski – percussion, vocals
 Rachella Searight – vocals
 Candy West – vocals
 Peaches West – vocals

Guests
 Ed Lee – sousaphone
 Carlos Malta – pife, bass flute, alto flute, flute, & soprano sax
 Jeff Coffin – tenor sax, alto flute
 Jacob Collier – vocals, piano, harmonizer
 Michelle Willis – pump organ & vocals
 Charlie Hunter – guitar
 David Crosby – vocals, acoustic guitar
 Roger Tallroth (Väsen) – parlor guitar, 12-string acoustic guitar
 Louis Cole (Knower) – drums
 Olov Johansson (Väsen) – nyckelharpa
 Bernardo Aguiar – pandeiro, percussion
 André Ferrari (Väsen) – percussion
 Carolina Araoz – vocals
 Genevieve Artadi (Knower) – vocals
 Susana Baca – vocals
 Amos Gohi Baraon – vocals
 Aminata Dante – vocals
 Salif Keita – vocals
 Bah Kouyate-Kone – vocals
 Laura Mvula – vocals
 Becca Stevens – vocals, acoustic guitar, charango
 Chris Turner – vocals

Nola International
 Sam Williams – trombone
 Terence Blanchard – trumpet
 Khris Royal – alto saxophone
 John Gros – organ
 Brian Coogan – piano, vocals
 Ivan Neville – clavinet, vocals
 Big D Perkins – electric guitar
 Donald Ramsey – bass guitar
 Jamison Ross – drums
 Terence Higgins – drums
 Mike Dillon – percussion
 Jason Marsalis – percussion
 Nigel Hall – vocals

Charts

References

2016 albums
Snarky Puppy albums
GroundUPmusic albums
Sequel albums